Air Marshal Sir Hector Douglas McGregor,  (15 February 1910 – 11 April 1973) was a senior Royal Air Force commander.

RAF career
Born in New Zealand and educated at Napier Boys' High School, McGregor joined the Royal Air Force in 1928. He served as a pilot but in 1931 he attended the Aircraft Engineering Course and he subsequently undertook several engineering-related tours. He served in World War II as Officer Commanding No. 33 Squadron at Heliopolis in Egypt and then at Lydda in Palestine where he earned the Distinguished Service Order for his leadership during policing duties. He went on to be Officer Commanding No. 213 Squadron at RAF Biggin Hill in 1940, Station Commander at RAF Ballyhalbert in 1941 and then Senior Air Service Officer at No. 82 Group later the same year before being made Officer Commanding, Tangmere Sector in 1942. He became deputy director, Operations, Intelligence and Plans at Headquarters Mediterranean Air Command in 1943 and Air Officer Commanding Air Headquarters Levant in 1944.
 
After the War, he became Air Officer Commanding No. 2 Group in 1951 before being appointed Director of Guided Missile Development at the Ministry of Supply in 1953. He went on to be Assistant Controller, Aircraft at the Ministry of Supply in 1956, Chief of Staff (Air Defence) at Headquarters SHAPE in 1957 and Commander-in-Chief of Fighter Command in 1959. His last appointment was as Commander-in-Chief of the Far East Air Force in 1962 before he retired in 1964.

In retirement, McGregor became Chairman of the New Zealand News Consultative Board in 1964.

References

|-

|-

|-

1910 births
1973 deaths
New Zealand military personnel
Commanders of the Order of the British Empire
Companions of the Distinguished Service Order
Knights Commander of the Order of the Bath
Officers of the Legion of Merit
People educated at Napier Boys' High School
People from Wairoa
Royal Air Force air marshals
Mandatory Palestine military personnel of World War II